is a railway station on the Minobu Line of Central Japan Railway Company (JR Central) located in the town of Nanbu, Minamikoma District, Yamanashi Prefecture, Japan.

Lines
Tōshima Station is served by the Minobu Line and is located 26.3 kilometers from the southern terminus of the line at Fuji Station.

Layout
Tōshima Station has a single island platform, connected to a two-story concrete station building with a waiting room by a level crossing. The station is unattended.

Platform

Adjacent stations

History
Tōshima Station was opened on August 10, 1918 as a terminal siding of the original Fuji-Minobu Line. The line was extended to Ustubuna a couple months later in October 1918. Tōshima was elevated to the status of a full station on June 22, 1936. The line came under control of the Japanese Government Railways on May 1, 1941. The JGR became the JNR (Japan National Railway) after World War II. The station has been unattended since June 1, 1983. Along with the division and privatization of JNR on April 1, 1987, the station came under the control and operation of the Central Japan Railway Company. The station building was rebuilt in March 1994.

Surrounding area
 Fuji River

See also
 List of railway stations in Japan

External links

 Minobu Line station information 

Railway stations in Japan opened in 1918
Railway stations in Yamanashi Prefecture
Minobu Line
Nanbu, Yamanashi